Metopoceras khalildja is a moth of the family Noctuidae. It is found in Morocco, Spain, Sicily, Algeria, Tunisia, Libya and Egypt

The wingspan is about 29 mm. Adults are on wing in March.

Subspecies
Metopoceras khalildja khalildja
Metopoceras khalildja suenderi (Formentera, Balearic Islands)

External links
species info

Metopoceras
Moths of Europe